Dr. Silvana & Cia. is a Brazilian rock musical band, formed in Rio de Janeiro.

Career
Dr. Silvana & Cia. was formed in 1984 by Ricardo Zimetbaum, Cícero Pestana, Jorge Soledade and Edu, in Rio de Janeiro. They are known in Brazil for their humorous and double entendre lyrics

The band recorded the single Eh! Oh! for CBS in 1984 and the album Dr. Silvana & Cia. for CBS. Two songs from the album were hits  Serão Extra and Taca a Mãe pra Ver se Quica.

In 1985, the band was featured in the compilation album Que delícia de Rock, recorded by CBS. In 1989, the group recorded Ataca Outra Vez, their second album. Other albums are A Vingança (1993) and  Choco, Choco, Chocolate (2005). Nowadays the band has a new lineup and performs around Brazil in 1980s revival events.

Current members 
 Cícero Pestana - guitar
 Vagner Beraldo - bass
 Maurício Mello - percussion

Original line-up 
 Ricardo Zimetbaum - lead vocals
 Cícero Pestana - guitar
 Jorge Soledade - bass (died on 27 May 2010, from respiratory failure after an aorta surgery in Hospital Pedro Ernesto in Vila Isabel
 Edu - percussion

Ricardo Zimetbaum left the band to pursue a solo career. He also took part of the band The Musicians with Fabricio "Leonardo Leo" (guitar) and Marcelo Penteado (bass) between 1993 and 1994.

Discography 
 1984 - Eh! Oh! (compact) - CBS
 1985 - Dr. Silvana & Cia - CBS
 1987 - Tide - CBS
 1989 - Ataca Outra Vez - RGE
 1993 - A Vingança - RPG
 2005 - Choco, Choco, Chocolate - Selesom

See also 
 Brazilian rock
 Música popular brasileira

References

External links 
Dicionário Cravo Albin de Música Popular Brasileira

Brazilian rock music groups
Musical groups established in 1984
Musical groups from Rio de Janeiro (city)
1984 establishments in Brazil